The After Laughter Tour was the fourth world tour by American  rock band Paramore, in support of their fifth studio album After Laughter (2017). The tour began on May 10, 2017 in Nashville, Tennessee, and concluded on September 7, 2018 in Nashville, Tennessee.

This was the first touring cycle since 2010 to feature drummer Zac Farro, who left the band on December 18, 2010, and rejoined on February 2, 2017.

Background 
On April 19, 2017 Paramore released "Hard Times" as the lead single from their fifth studio album, After Laughter, and on the same day announced European tour dates. On May 3, 2017 the band released "Told You So as a single in the UK, acting as the second single from their fifth studio album. The full release of the album followed on May 12, 2017. The same day they also announced the 3rd Parahoy! Cruise, and on May 15, 2017 they announced North American tour dates. On November 17, 2017 the band released "Fake Happy" as their third single off After Laughter. On February 5, 2018 the band released their fourth single off After Laughter, "Rose-Colored Boy." And finally, on June 26, 2018, Paramore released their fifth and final single off the album, "Caught in the Middle.

The first set of tour dates were announced as "Tour One" on April 19, 2017, with the band touring intimate venues in Europe. Parahoy! Cruise was announced on May 12, 2017, coinciding with the release of After Laughter. The second set of tour dates were announced as "Tour Two" on May 15, 2017, touring intimate venues in North America. Due to Hurricane Irma, the band had to reschedule the Orlando and Miami dates for December 5 and 6, 2017. The third set of tour dates were announced as "Tour Three" on August 25, 2017, touring arenas in Europe. The fourth set of tour dates were announced as "Tour Four" on November 7, 2017, touring arenas in Oceania, Asia, and Hawaii. Due to Williams getting sick, the Jakarta and Manila dates were rescheduled. The fifth and final set of tour dates were announced on March 8, 2018 as "Tour Five" and was officially called The After Laughter Summer Tour with Foster The People.

The band announced the final show of the After Laughter era on June 26, 2018. The show is called Art + Friends, and happened in Nashville, Tennessee on September 7, 2018. The band have described it as "a celebration of Nashville music, art and community." Paramore performed a headline show, with support from bands COIN, Bully, Nightingail, and artists Liza Anne and Canon Blue.

A review of the Mountain View performance stated "From Williams encouraging the unity of fans in her speeches to the whole band exuding raw emotion in its performance, the band has truly mastered the art of audience connection."

2017 Paramore Tours

Pre-Album Cycle Show

Setlist

Tour dates

Tour One

Opening act
Bleached (June 15 – 29 & July 2 & 3).....

Setlist

Tour dates

One-Off Shows

Opening act
PVRIS (October 23)

Setlist

Tour dates

Tour Two

Opening act
Flor (September 6 & December 5 & December 6)
Best Coast (September 11 – October 17)

Setlist

Tour dates

2018 Paramore Tours

Tour Three

Opening act
mewithoutYou

Setlist

Tour dates

Tour Four

Opening act
Bleachers (February 8 – February 13)

Setlist

Tour dates

Parahoy!

Support acts
Local Natives
Judah & the Lion
mewithoutYou
Now, Now
HalfNoise
Mija

Comedians
Jordan Rock
Ryan O'Flanagan

Tour dates

The After Laughter Summer Tour (Tour Five)

Opening act
Foster The People
Soccer Mommy (June 12 – July 1)
Jay Som (July 2 – July 24)

Setlist

Tour dates

One-Off Shows

Setlist

Tour dates

Art + Friends

Support acts
Nightingail
Liza Anne
Canon Blue
Bully
COIN

Setlist

Tour dates

References

Paramore concert tours
2017 concert tours
2018 concert tours